There are at least 20 named mountains in Valley County, Montana.
 Castle Butte, el. 
 Coal Mine Hill, el. 
 Dead Mans Hill, el. 
 Glass Hill, el. 
 Graveyard Hill, el. 
 Johnnys Hill, el. 
 Kaminski Hill, el. 
 Landre Hills, el. 
 Laundry Hill, el. 
 Lighthouse Hill, el. 
 Lookout, el. 
 Murray Hill, el. 
 Round Butte, el. 
 Round Butte, el. 
 Seventh Point Buttes, el. 
 Spencer Point, el. 
 Three Buttes, el. 
 Tiger Butte, el. 
 Two Buttes, el. 
 White Highland Hills, el.

See also
 List of mountains in Montana
 List of mountain ranges in Montana

Notes

Landforms of Valley County, Montana
Valley